Philippe Delaye (born 26 June 1975) is a French former professional footballer who played as a midfielder for Montpellier, among other teams.

Personal life
Delaye is the father of Sacha Delaye, who is also a professional footballer and plays for Montpellier.

Honours
Montpellier
UEFA Intertoto Cup: 1999

References

External links
 
 

1975 births
Living people
People from Montbrison, Loire
Sportspeople from Loire (department)
French footballers
Footballers from Auvergne-Rhône-Alpes
Association football midfielders
Ligue 1 players
Ligue 2 players
Montpellier HSC players
Stade Rennais F.C. players
SC Bastia players
FC Istres players